El Paso Union Depot is an Amtrak train station in El Paso, Texas, served by the Texas Eagle and Sunset Limited. The station was designed by architect Daniel Burnham, who also designed Washington D.C. Union Station. It was built between 1905 and 1906 and was added to the National Register of Historic Places in 1971.

History
The station served as a transfer point for several railroads. The Atchison, Topeka & Santa Fe ran a train north to Socorro, Belen and Albuquerque. The  National Railways of Mexico operated a train, "El Fronterizo", numbers 7 & 8, south to Ciudad Chihuahua, Chihuahua in Mexico. The Southern Pacific Railway operated trans-continental trains west to California, and east to Louisiana via Texas. The Texas Pacific and then the Missouri Pacific Railroad operated trains to Fort Worth, Texas.

Present

In addition to Amtrak service, the station is served by Sun Metro local buses at nearby stops. There has been intermittent talk of resurrecting streetcar service across the border to Ciudad Juarez since the last trolley rolled in 1974.

The station's office space are occupied by the Texas Tech College of Architecture, which opened in 2013. Sun Metro was formerly headquartered in the space until it moved in 2014.

See also

National Register of Historic Places listings in El Paso County, Texas
Recorded Texas Historic Landmarks in El Paso County

References

External links
 
 El Paso Amtrak station information

 Union Depot history, El Paso Community College
 Article in Railroad Gazette (1904) with original floor plan
 TrainWeb
 El Paso Amtrak Station (USA Rail Guide)
 El Paso Streetcars
 Railroad & Transportation Museum of El Paso

Towers completed in 1906
National Register of Historic Places in El Paso County, Texas
Buildings and structures in El Paso, Texas
Transportation in El Paso, Texas
El Paso
El Paso
Railway stations in the United States opened in 1906
Economy of El Paso, Texas
Atchison, Topeka and Santa Fe Railway stations
Former Southern Pacific Railroad stations
Transportation buildings and structures in El Paso County, Texas
Railway stations on the National Register of Historic Places in Texas
1906 establishments in Texas